Zoran Lakić (31 October 1933 – 20 December 2022) was a Montenegrin historian who was a member of the Montenegrin Academy of Sciences and Arts.

Lakić was born on 31 October 1933. He died on 20 December 2022, at the age of 89.

References

1933 births
2022 deaths
Members of the Montenegrin Academy of Sciences and Arts
Montenegrin historians